Wannian is a county in the northeast of Jiangxi province, China. It is under the jurisdiction of the prefecture-level city of Shangrao.

Wannian County comprises 6 towns and 9 townships.

The county seat and largest population center is Chényíng Town.  The second largest population center and former county seat is Qīngyún Town, formerly Chéngguān Town.

In addition to farming, pearl and concrete production are economically important.  There is limited mining.

The local dialect, Wannianese, is a dialect of the Gan Chinese language.

Administrative divisions
In the present, Wannian County has 6 towns and 6 townships.
6 towns

6 townships

Climate

Tourist attractions
Wannian is the location of the Xianren Cave (Fairy Cave), where historically  important finds have been made of ancient pottery shards and rice grains.

Transportation

Rail
Wannian is served by the Anhui–Jiangxi Railway.

References

Shangrao
County-level divisions of Jiangxi